The Ministry of Transport and Roads is a ministry of the Government of South Sudan. The incumbent minister is Agnes Poni Lokudu, while Mayom Kuoc Malek serves as deputy minister.

List of Ministers of Transport and Roads

See also
 Ministry of Roads and Bridges (South Sudan)

References

Transport and Roads
South Sudan
South Sudan, Transport and Roads
Transport organisations based in South Sudan